The DAP Championship was a golf tournament on the Web.com Tour from 2016 to 2018. It was played at Canterbury Golf Club in the Cleveland suburb of Beachwood, Ohio. The tournament was part of the Web.com Tour Finals.

Winners

See also
Rust-Oleum Championship, a Web.com Tour event in the Cleveland suburb of Westlake from 2013 to 2014
Legend Financial Group Classic, a Web.com Tour event in the Cleveland suburb of Highland Heights from 2005 to 2007
Greater Cleveland Open, a Web.com Tour event from 1990 to 2001
Cleveland Open, a PGA Tour event from 1963 to 1972

References

External links
Coverage on Web.com Tour's official site

Former Korn Ferry Tour events
Golf in Ohio
Sports competitions in Cleveland
Recurring sporting events established in 2016
Recurring sporting events disestablished in 2018
2016 establishments in Ohio
2018 establishments in Ohio